The Illusion World Tour was the fourth concert tour by Colombian musician, singer-songwriter Fonseca in support of his fourth studio album, Ilusión. The tour began in Loja, Ecuador, and continued through Central America and Oceania in the last months of 2012. The tour then continued in South America and North America, with more dates in January and April 2013, before ending on May 12, 2013 in Seattle, Washington, at the Mayden Bauer Center.

Background and development 
Fonseca begin travelling with a small tour supporting his fourth album Ilusión, beginning on September 12, 2012. The two acts in America Central are part of the Gigantes Tour with singers Marc Anthony and Chayanne.{{dead link|date=July 2021 The date scheduled for Costa Rica was postponed until September 30 due road blocks  on roads in Nicaragua, because of a Salvadoran strike. The three acts in Australia feature the musician Willie Colón, the second show (in Brisbane) is part of the Clave Contra Clave (Latin Live Competition) as the final act.

Opening acts 
Daniel Betancourth (Ecuador)

Setlist 
This is the setlist for Ecuador shows.
"Eres Mi Sueño"
"Viene Subiendo"
"Corazón"
"Enrédame"
"Perdón"
"Mercedes"
"Cantor de Fonseca"
"Ay Amor"
"Paraíso"
"Abcdario"
"Beautiful Sunshine"
"Confiésame"
"El Alma en los Labios"
"Alma" (acoustic)
"Ilusión"
"Desde Que No Estás"
"Arroyito"
"Te Mando Flores"
"Hace Tiempo"
Encore
"Idilio"
"Como Me Mira"
"Eres Mi Sueño"

Tour dates

References 

Fonseca (singer) concert tours
2012 concert tours
2013 concert tours